Jonathan Wilson is a British-born writer and professor who lives in Newton, Massachusetts. 
He is the Fletcher Professor of Rhetoric and Debate as well as the Director of the Center for Humanities at Tufts University.  Within the English Department at Tufts, he teaches courses on Creative Writing and contemporary American Fiction. He lives with his wife, Sharon Kaitz, who is an artist. He has two sons, Adam Wilson, a journalist and writer and Gabriel Wilson, who works in film.

Writing 
Wilson is the author of the following books:-
 short story collection Schoom (Viking 1994) 
 novel The Hiding Room 
 novel A Palestine Affair 
 story collection An Ambulance is on the Way: Stories of Men in Trouble (Nectbook/Schocken, 2007)
 biography Marc Chagall (Nextbook/Schocken, 2007) 
 Herzog: The Limits of Ideas Twayne, and
 On Bellow's Planet: Readings from the Dark Side
 Autobiography Kick and Run, Memoir with a Soccer Ball (Bloomsbury Reader, 2013) 
His stories and essays have appeared in The New Yorker, the New York Times Magazine, Best American Short Stories and elsewhere. Wilson writes a column on soccer for the Internet Newspaper, The Faster Times

Awards 
A Palestine Affair was a finalist for the 2004 National Jewish Book Awards, and Marc Chagall (Jewish Encounters) was a runner-up for the 2007 National Jewish Book Award. He is a Guggenheim Fellowship recipient.

Education 
Ph.D., English, Hebrew University of Jerusalem Israel, 1982 
St. Catherine's College, Oxford, England, 1977
Columbia University, New York, U.S.A. Visiting Scholar, 1976
B.A., (Hons.) First Class. University of Essex, England, 1974. Major: English and European Literature. Minor: Art History

References

External links 
 Jonathan Wilson's Tufts Faculty Page
 Wilson's profile on The Faster Times
 Wilson's Random House profile

Tufts University faculty
English writers
Alumni of the University of Essex
Living people
The Fletcher School at Tufts University faculty
English male writers
Year of birth missing (living people)